Summer Breeze may refer to:

 Summer Breeze (album), a 1972 album by Seals and Crofts
 "Summer Breeze" (song), the title song, also covered by The Isley Brothers and others
 Summer Breeze (TV series), a 1987 American single-episode pilot
 Summer Breeze Festival UK, an annual music festival in the United Kingdom
 Summer Breeze Open Air, an annual heavy metal festival in Germany
 Summer Breeze (rock festival), a cancelled 2008 rock festival planned for Seoul, South Korea
 Summer Breeze Festival (California), an R&B festival
 Summerbreeze, a 2000 compilation produced by DJ Tiësto
 "Summer Breeze", a single by Lords of Lyrics from their 1996 album Heaven or Hell
 "Summer Breeze", a song by SF9, 2020
 "Summer Breeze", a song by Chris Brown from Heartbreak on a Full Moon, 2017

See also
 Breeze (disambiguation)
 Summer (disambiguation)
 "Summer Wind", a 1965 song